Arnold "Arno" Doomernik (born 14 August 1970) is a Dutch former footballer who played as a defensive midfielder. He most notably played for Roda JC, where he won two KNVB Cup trophies. He also represented Sparta and NAC.

Club career
Doomernik first played for OSC '45 and then became part of the youth academy of PSV, where he could not break into the first team. In 1992, he was loaned to Sparta, where he played for one season. In 1993, he was signed by Roda JC, where his former youth coach Huub Stevens had become the new manager. At Roda, he became part of a successful side which finished second in the 1994–95 Eredivisie, and which won the 1996–97 and 1999–2000 KNVB Cups.

During the summer of 2000, Doomernik was loaned to NAC, where he stayed for two seasons. He did not play any matches in his second season, however, as a serious hip injury forced his retirement. He played his last match in May 2001, at the age of 30.

Personal life
Doomernik was a youth coach at NAC, Roda JC and VV Schaesberg before joining EHC in 2014. He is married to Darlene and the couple have two children.

Honours
Roda JC
KNVB Cup: 1996–97, 1999–2000

References

1970 births
Living people
Sportspeople from 's-Hertogenbosch
Footballers from North Brabant
Dutch footballers
Association football midfielders
Sparta Rotterdam players
Roda JC Kerkrade players
NAC Breda players
Eredivisie players
20th-century Dutch people